Bromley London Borough Council is the local authority for the London Borough of Bromley. The council is elected every four years.

Political control
The first election to the council was held in 1964, initially operating as a shadow authority before the new system came into full effect the following year. Political control of the council since 1964 has been held by the following parties:

Leadership
The leaders of the council since 1967 have been:

Council elections
 1964 Bromley London Borough Council election
 1968 Bromley London Borough Council election
 1971 Bromley London Borough Council election (boundary changes took place but the number of seats remained the same)
 1974 Bromley London Borough Council election
 1978 Bromley London Borough Council election (boundary changes took place but the number of seats remained the same)
 1982 Bromley London Borough Council election
 1986 Bromley London Borough Council election
 1990 Bromley London Borough Council election
 1994 Bromley London Borough Council election (boundary changes took place but the number of seats remained the same)
 1998 Bromley London Borough Council election
 2002 Bromley London Borough Council election (boundary changes took place but the number of seats remained the same) 
 2006 Bromley London Borough Council election
 2010 Bromley London Borough Council election
 2014 Bromley London Borough Council election
 2018 Bromley London Borough Council election
 2022 Bromley London Borough Council election

Borough result maps

By-election results

1964-1968
There were no by-elections.

1968-1971

1971-1974

1974-1978

1978-1982

1982-1986

1986-1990

1990-1994

The by-election was called following the resignation of Cllr. Montague I. Blazey.

The by-election was called following the resignation of Cllr. Reginald G. Adams.

1994-1998

The by-election was called following the resignation of Cllr. Stephen R. Oxenbridge.

The by-election was called following the resignation of Cllr. David M. Dear.

1998-2002

The by-election was called following the death of Cllr. Sheila A. Humphreys.

The by-election was called following the resignation of Cllr. Paul J. H. Booth.

The by-election was called following the death of Cllr. Eric N. Goodman.

The by-election was called following the resignation of Cllr. Graem Peters.

The by-election was called following the resignation of Cllr. Robert J. Yeldham.

2002-2006
There were no by-elections.

2006-2010

The by-election was called following the death of Cllr. Christopher R. Gaster.

2010-2014

The by-election was called following the resignation of Cllr. George R. Taylor.

The by-election was called following the resignation of Cllr. Ms. Diana L. Macmull.

2014-2018

2018-2022

The by-election was called following the resignation of Cllr. Dave Wibberley

The by-election was called following the resignation of Cllr. Marina Ahmad

References

External links
 Bromley Council